Matthias Joseph Isuja (14 August 1929 – 13 April 2016) was a Tanzanian Roman Catholic prelate.

Ordained a priest in 1960, Isuja served as bishop of the Roman Catholic Diocese of Dodoma, Tanzania from 1972 to 2005.

He died in 2016.

See also

Notes

1929 births
2016 deaths
20th-century Roman Catholic bishops in Tanzania
21st-century Roman Catholic bishops in Tanzania
Roman Catholic bishops of Dodoma
Tanzanian Roman Catholic bishops